The siege of Caffa was a siege of the Genoese port town of Caffa by a large Crimean Tatar army under the Golden Horde, led by their Khan Jani Beg. The Mongol army threw the bodies of Mongol warriors who had died of plague over the walls of the besieged city, which is considered as one of the earliest examples of Biological warfare. On the basis of Gabriel de Mussis' writings, the Black Death is widely believed to have reached Europe from the Crimea as the result of the biological warfare attacks during the siege.

Background
Caffa was established by Geneose traders in 1266 by a purchase agreement with the Khan of the Golden Horde. 

Relations between the Geneose and the Mongol Golden Horde were strained. The khan of the Golden Horde, Toqta, was piqued at the Italian trade in Turkic slaves who were sold as soldiers to the Mamluk Sultanate. He arrested the Italian residents of Sarai (the Mongol capital), and besieged Caffa, which the Genoese resisted for a year, but in 1308 set fire to their city and abandoned it. Relations between the Italians and the Golden Horde remained tense until Toqta’s death in 1312.

Toqtai’s successor, Özbeg Khan, mended relations with the Geneose, which allowed Caffa to become a thriving city once again by the 1340s. However, the ascension of Özbeg Khan's son Jani Beg to the throne changed the political scene once more. The conversion of the Golden Horde Khans to Islam, led to them prosecuting Christians.

Siege
The Mongols under Jani Beg besieged Caffa in 1343 and the Venetian territory of Tana, the cause of which was a brawl between Italians and Muslims in Tana. The siege of Caffa lasted until February 1344, when it was lifted after an Italian relief force killed 15,000 Mongol troops and destroyed their siege machines. 

Jani Beg renewed the siege in 1345, and cut off any supplies to the city, leading to miserable conditions within Caffa. However, a serious epidemic of Bubonic plague devastated his forces, giving hope to the Italians, and he was forced to lift the siege in 1347. Before retreating though, in a final act of sabotage, Jani Beg used catapults to launch the Plague-infested corpses of his dead soldiers over the fortified walls of Caffa. The Italians quickly dumped these bodies back into the sea, but the damage was done. In an attempt to escape the Plague epidemic, four Genoese ships thought to be safe from the disease, sailed out from Caffa. These ships are believed to have brought the Plague deep into Europe. The siege and despair of the city's citizens as the disease spread is vividly described by the Italian notary Gabriel de Mussis.

The Italians blockaded Mongol ports, forcing Jani Beg to negotiate for peace, and they were allowed to reestablish their colony in Tana in 1347.

References 

Biological warfare
Conflicts in 1345
Sieges involving the Mongol Empire
Sieges involving the Republic of Venice
Military history of the Republic of Genoa